Katpadi is a state assembly constituency in Vellore district in Tamil Nadu, India. Its State Assembly Constituency number is 40. It comprises portions of the Katpadi, Vellore, and Walajah taluks. It is a part of Arakkonam constituency for national elections to the Parliament of India. The constituency was formed in 1962 by separating Gudiyatham constituency. It is one of the 234 State Legislative Assembly Constituencies in Tamil Nadu, in India.

Demographics

Madras State

Tamil Nadu

Election Results

2021

2016

2011

2006

2001

1996

1991

1989

1984

1980

1977

1971

1967

1962

References 

 

Assembly constituencies of Tamil Nadu
Vellore district